Utus Peak is the rocky peak rising to 1206 m in Trakiya Heights on Trinity Peninsula in Graham Land, Antarctica.

The peak is named after the ancient Roman town of Utus in Northern Bulgaria.

Location
German-British mapping in 1996.

Maps
 Trinity Peninsula. Scale 1:250000 topographic map No. 5697. Institut für Angewandte Geodäsie and British Antarctic Survey, 1996.
 Antarctic Digital Database (ADD). Scale 1:250000 topographic map of Antarctica. Scientific Committee on Antarctic Research (SCAR). Since 1993, regularly updated.

Notes

References
 Utus Peak. SCAR Composite Antarctic Gazetteer
 Bulgarian Antarctic Gazetteer. Antarctic Place-names Commission. (details in Bulgarian, basic data in English)

External links
 Utus Peak. Copernix satellite image

Mountains of Trinity Peninsula
Bulgaria and the Antarctic